is a railway station on the Suigun Line in the town of Yamatsuri, Fukushima, Japan operated by East Japan Railway Company (JR East).

Lines

Station layout
Iwaki-Ishii Station has one side platform serving a single bi-directional track. The station originally had two side platforms, and the unused platform and footbridge are still in place. The station is unattended.

History
The station opened on October 10, 1931. The station was absorbed into the JR East network upon the privatization of the Japanese National Railways (JNR) on April 1, 1987.

Surrounding area

Takajo Post Office

See also
 List of Railway Stations in Japan

External links

  

Stations of East Japan Railway Company
Railway stations in Fukushima Prefecture
Suigun Line
Railway stations in Japan opened in 1931
Yamatsuri, Fukushima